The Bloodstained Butterfly  is a 1971 giallo film directed by Duccio Tessari. It starred Helmut Berger and Ida Galli.

Plot 
A young French woman named Françoise Pigaut (Carole André) meets a man in a public park in the rain. They get into a violent altercation, so the man gags Françoise before stabbing her to death with a switchblade. She takes a tumble down a hill, where a little girl in a raincoat finds her and rushes to get help.

TV sports host Alessandro Marchi (Giancarlo Sbragia) is witnessed fleeing the scene, and he's arrested and taken to trial. Françoise was revealed to be having an affair with Marchi, whose daughter Sarah (Wendy D'Olive) was a friend of hers, yet she was also in a relationship with Giorgio (Helmut Berger), a young pianist. The motive is presented as Françoise dumping Marchi at the park for Giorgio, and Marchi killed her in a rage when he tried to force her to stay with him or tried to rape her. Marchi is convicted, and it's revealed his lawyer, Giulio Cordaro (Günther Stoll), deliberately restrained himself from a more aggressive defense to continue his affair with Marki's wife, Maria (Evelyn Stewart).

A prostitute is found murdered in the same park, the hallmark details bearing similarity to Françoise's murder. As the police don't give much consideration to the similarities, a caller claiming to be the killer taunts the inspector on the case, Berardi (Silvano Tranquilli), saying he'll kill someone else. Shortly after, a third woman is slashed to death in the same park. A retrial finds Marchi innocent of Françoise's murder, and he's released with his conviction overturned.

The inspector goes to the store where the switchblade were bought, and the owner gives him the killer's identity. A meeting Marchi is brought to in an abandoned building reveals Giorgio was the killer. As the police rush to the scene to try and stop them, figuring everything out, Giorgio confesses he only killed the last two women, as he knew Marchi murdered Françoise when Marchi bumped into Giorgio while fleeing the scene. Marchi confesses to Françoise's murder, and Giorgio shoots Marchi. When checking to see if he's dead, Giorgio is stabbed by Marchi. When Marchi tries to flee, Giorgio shoots him dead, dying smiling over his accomplished plan.

Cast 
Helmut Berger: Giorgio
Giancarlo Sbragia: Alessandro Marchi
Evelyn Stewart (Ida Galli): Maria Marchi
Wendy D'Olive: Sarah Marchi
Silvano Tranquilli: Inspector Berardi
Carole André: Françoise Pigaut
Lorella De Luca: Marta Clerici
Günther Stoll: Attorney Giulio Cordaro
Wolfgang Preiss: The Prosecutor
Dana Ghia: Diamante

Critical reception 
AllMovie gave the film a positive review, writing "this beautifully assembled giallo is among the best of its time" and that it features a "genuinely intelligent script, a rarity in a subgenre generally known for flamboyant visuals at the expense of narrative cohesion."

References

Further reading

External links 
 
 

n:Una farfalla con le ali insanguinate

Giallo films
1971 films
Films directed by Duccio Tessari
Films scored by Gianni Ferrio
1970s crime thriller films
1970s Italian-language films
1970s Italian films